Scotorythra nephelosticta is a moth of the family Geometridae. It was first described by Edward Meyrick in 1899. It is endemic to the Hawaiian islands of Kauai and Oahu.

Subspecies
Scotorythra nephelosticta nephelosticta (Kauai)
Scotorythra nephelosticta cocytias (Oahu)

External links

N
Endemic moths of Hawaii
Biota of Kauai
Biota of Oahu